Siby may refer to:

 Siby (name), a given name and surname (including lists of people with the name)
 Siby, Mali, a village and rural commune in the Cercle of Kati, Koulikoro Region, Mali
 Siby Department, a commune of Balé Province, Burkina Faso
 Siby, Burkina Faso, capital of Siby Department

See also 
 Sybi Hida, Albanian politician
 Sibby, a given name, including a list of people with the name
 Sibi (disambiguation)